Ma Xiangbo (April 7, 1840 – November 4, 1939) was a Chinese Jesuit priest, scholar and educator in late-Qing and early-Republican China. He was one of the founders of Aurora University, Fu Jen Catholic University and Fudan University.

Ma Xiangbo's original given name was Jianchang but was changed to Liang. "Xiangbo" was his courtesy name. He also adopted the Catholic name "Joseph."

Biography
Ma Xiangbo was born in Dantu, Jiangsu province to a prominent Catholic family. At the age of 11, he enrolled in a French Jesuit school in Shanghai, Collège Saint-Ignace (now Xuhui High School), where he remained first as student and later as teacher until 1870. In 1870, he was ordained priest in the Jesuit order.

Yet due to the French aggressions towards China, Ma would leave the priesthood in 1876 and eventually be married and have a family. In 1886/87, he visited France and eventually devoted his life to higher education. Ma founded the following institutions of higher learning:

 Aurora Academy  (1903)
 Fudan Public School (1905)
 Fu Jen Catholic University (1925), in co-operation with Ying Lianzhi

His idea of establishing a highest body of learning was eventually realized in 1928 by his close friend, the educator Cai Yuanpei, who established the Academia Sinica.

Ma Xiangbo and his brother, Ma Jianzhong, also led significant political lives. Ma Jiangzhong was a prominent official in the Qing government and Ma Xiangbo served as a diplomat from 1881 to 1897 in various postings in Asia including Japan (Tokyo 1881, Yokohama 1892), Korea (1882-1885?), Europe (Britain and France 1886–1887) and the United States.

References

Further reading

External links

 Biography of Ma Xiangbo

Educators from Zhenjiang
Writers from Zhenjiang
Qing dynasty translators
1840 births
1939 deaths
Chinese Jesuits
Academic staff of Fu Jen Catholic University
20th-century Chinese Roman Catholic priests
Academic staff of Fudan University
Presidents of Fudan University
Republic of China translators
19th-century Chinese Roman Catholic priests